Events in the year 1825 in Norway.

Incumbents
Monarch: Charles III John

Events

 4 July – The sloop Restauration set sail from Stavanger to New York City. It is considered the first organized emigration from Norway to the United States.
 27 November – Population Census: Norway had 1,051,318 inhabitants.

Arts and literature
 Det Dramatiske Selskab in Egersund is founded.

Births
13 March – Hans Gude, painter (d.1903)
30 March – Theodor Kjerulf, geologist and poet (d.1888)
28 April – Lorenz Juhl Vogt, politician (d.1901)
1 June – Jacob Aall Ottesen, Norwegian American minister, theologian and church leader (died 1904)
10 June – Sondre Norheim, skier and pioneer of modern skiing (d.1897)
16 June – Herman Amberg Preus, Norwegian American Lutheran clergyman and church leader (died 1894)
9 October – Oluf Andreas Aabel, priest and writer (d.1895)
24 October – Carl Anton Bjerknes, mathematician and physicist (d.1903)
17 November – Jacob Kielland, naval officer and politician (d.1889)

Full date unknown
Carl Johan Severin Steen, politician (d.1874)

Deaths
 2 February – Laurents Hallager, physician and lexicographer
 18 March – Henriette Mathiesen, culture personality (born 1762)
 12 August – Magdalene Sophie Buchholm, poet (born 1758)

See also

References